The 2017–18 Missouri Tigers men's basketball team represented the University of Missouri in the 2017–18 NCAA Division I men's basketball season. They were led by head coach Cuonzo Martin who was in his first year at Missouri. The team played its home games at Mizzou Arena in Columbia, Missouri as sixth-year members of the Southeastern Conference. On October 22, 2017, the Tigers renewed their rivalry against Kansas in an exhibition game for four different charities for Hurricane Harvey and Hurricane Maria relief funds. It marked the first time the teams played since Missouri left the Big 12 for the SEC. The event raised $1.75 million for hurricane relief. They finished the season 20–13, 10–8 in SEC play to finish in a three-way tie for fourth place. As the No. 5 seed in the SEC tournament, they lost in the second round to Georgia. They received an at-large bid to the NCAA tournament where they lost in the First Round to Florida State.

Previous season
The Tigers finished the 2016–17 season 8–24, 2–16 in SEC play to finish in a tie for 13th place. As the No. 14 seed in the SEC tournament, they defeated Auburn in the first round before losing in the second round to Ole Miss.

On March 5, 2017, head coach Kim Anderson was asked to step down as head coach of the Tigers following the season. He was allowed to coach the team in the SEC tournament. On March 15, the school hired Cuonzo Martin as head coach.

Offseason
Shortly after his hiring at Missouri, Cuonzo Martin hired Michael Porter Sr. as an assistant coach. Shortly thereafter, after being released from his commitment to Washington following the firing of Washington head coach Lorenzo Romar, Porter's son, No. 2 overall recruit Michael Porter Jr., committed to Missouri to play for the 2017–18 season. Nearly two months later, his younger brother, Jontay Porter, would join the family to play in Missouri this season.

Departures

Incoming transfers

2017 recruiting class

2018 Recruiting class

Roster

Schedule and results

|-
!colspan=12 style=|Exhibition

|-
!colspan=12 style=| Non-conference regular season

|-
!colspan=12 style=|SEC regular season

|-
!colspan=12 style=| SEC Tournament

|-
!colspan=9 style=| NCAA tournament

References

Missouri Tigers men's basketball seasons
Missouri
Missouri
Missouri, basketball men
Missouri, basketball, men